Loustalot is a surname. Notable people with the surname include:

Ángel Loustalot
Christophe Loustalot (born 1992), French rugby union player
E. V. Loustalot (died 1942), United States Army officer
Jules Loustalot
Tim Loustalot (born 1965), American golfer
Victoria Loustalot, American writer